The Green Mountain Cottage is a historic tourist accommodation at 61 Church Street in Mount Holly, Vermont.  Built about 1853 as a farm house, it was converted into a tourist house in the 1880s, and has undergone numerous alterations which give it a predominantly Colonial Revival feel.  The house, along with a period barn, were listed on the National Register of Historic Places in 2021.  It is now a private residence.

Description and history
The Green Mountain Cottage stands in Mount Holly's Belmont village center, on the north side of Church Street just northeast of the Village Baptist Church.  It is a rambling -story wood-frame structure, with gabled roofs and a clapboarded exterior.  The main block's front facade is spanned by a single-story porch, which extends partly onto the front of a two-story ell extending to its right.  The porch is supported by square columns, with a low turned balustrade.  The porch rises to a second story in the center bay, covered by a projecting gabled roof.  The interior is modestly finished, with plaster walls, wooden trim, and wooden floors.

The land where the cottage now stands was originally a farmstead developed in the first half of the 19th century.  The main block of the house was probably built around 1853, and was acquired as part of a  farm property in 1878 by Bart Chadburn, an immigrant from Quebec who worked in local industries.  Chadburn began opening the house to the tourist trade in the 1880s, and the business remained in the family until 1943.  It continued to be operated under other owners as a farm and tourist house until 1965.

See also
National Register of Historic Places listings in Rutland County, Vermont

References

Houses on the National Register of Historic Places in Vermont
National Register of Historic Places in Rutland County, Vermont
Colonial Revival architecture in Vermont
Houses completed in 1853
Houses in Rutland County, Vermont
Buildings and structures in Mount Holly, Vermont